Ravoux's slavemaker ant (Myrmoxenus ravouxi) is a species of slave-making ant endemic to Europe. The species are helotistic, that is, they oppress another species of ant in order to sustain their colony. The queen will fake death to entice ants from another colony to drag her back to their nest, where she awakens and kills the nest's original queen. She will then cover herself in the dead queen's pheromones, and will begin producing eggs. The slavemaker ants then overrun the colony and then find a new colony to take over.

See also
Formica sanguinea

References
Role of early experience in ant enslavement: a comparative analysis of a host and a non-host species, Rumsaïs Blatrix and Claire Sermage, Front Zool. 2005; 2: 13. Published online 2005 August 2. .

External links

Myrmicinae
Slave-making ants
Hymenoptera of Europe
Taxonomy articles created by Polbot
Taxobox binomials not recognized by IUCN